The Tarxien Cemetery phase is one of the eleven phases of Maltese prehistory. It is named for the Bronze Age burials on the site of the Tarxien temple complex near the village of Ħal Tarxien.

The Tarxien Cemetery phase, from approximately 2500 to 1500 BCE, follows the Tarxien phase, the last phase of the Temple period during which the principal megalithic temples of Malta were built. The culture is characterised not by large-scale temple building, but by dolmens and cremation cemeteries.

References

Bronze Age cultures of Europe
Archaeological cultures of Southern Europe
Archaeological cultures in Malta
Pre-Indo-Europeans
Megalithic Temples of Malta
Maltese prehistory